The Great Petition was a document produced in the Grand Duchy of Finland in 1899, during the first period of the Russification of Finland. It petitioned the Grand Duke of Finland, Tsar Nicholas II to reconsider his February Manifesto issued earlier in the same year. University students went from village to village to collect more than half a million signatures, roughly one fifth of the Finnish population at the time, within eleven days.

When the delegation, consisting of 500 men all around Finland, delivering the petition arrived in St Petersburg, the Tsar declined to see it. Thus, it failed to have any effect.

See also
Kagal (Finnish resistance movement)
Petition Movement for the Establishment of a Taiwanese Parliament

References 

Literature from periodicals:
 John William Nylander, Suuri lähetystö : muistoja ja tuokiokuvia (alkuteos: Den stora deputationen, suom. Santeri Ingman), 1899 (162 s.)
 Santeri Ingman, Suuri lähetystö : kertomus matkasta ja toimista; esittänyt S. I.. Laulajan tervehdys : runo / Ilmari Calamnius. Otava, 1899. (32 s.)
Book: 
 Päiviö Tommila, Suuri adressi 1899, WSOY (Werner Söderström Osakeyhtiö), Helsinki 1999,

External links 

 YLEn Elävä arkisto – Suuri lähetystö sortovaltaa vastaan, osa 40-vuotisjuhlallisuuksien dokumentista vuodelta 1939
 Suuren lähetystön jäsenet 13.–20.3.1899
 Suuri adressi arkistolaitoksen Portti verkkopalvelussa
 Suuri adressi digitaalisena Kansallisarkiston Digitaaliarkistossa
 Suuri adressi 1899 Kansallisarkiston Merkittävimmät asiakirjat 1890–2009 -verkkoasiakirjanäyttelyssä

1899 in Finland
Petitions